Cynthia Szigeti (October 26, 1949 – August 10, 2016) was an American comic actress and acting teacher, known for her work at the Groundlings, an improv and sketch comedy troupe and school in Los Angeles, and the ACME Comedy Theatre. Her students included Adam Carolla, Will Forte, Lisa Kudrow, Joel McHale, Conan O'Brien and Julia Sweeney. Her professional acting credits included National Lampoon's European Vacation, as well as roles in Seinfeld and Curb Your Enthusiasm.

Early life

Szigeti went to Fairfax High School in Los Angeles. She later received her master's degree in acting from the University of California, Los Angeles (UCLA). Szigeti began her career by waitressing at the Pitchell Players improv club after graduating from UCLA. Her work at the club inspired her to enroll in improv classes at The Groundlings, the L.A. improv school, for $45 a month. Szigeti took the classes before successfully auditioning to become a full-time member of The Groundlings' main comedy troupe.

Acting and improv career

Cynthia Szigeti eventually left The Groundlings for The Comedy Store, a comedy club in West Hollywood, where she joined The Comedy Store Players alongside Taylor Negron, Martin Short and Robin Williams. In a 2009 interview, Szigeti spoke of the differences between performing within the comedy troupes of The Groundlings versus The Comedy Club, saying, "At the Groundlings it was all about wigs, rehearsals and costumes. At the Store, it was immediate, topical and edgy."

During the 1980s, Szigeti returned to The Groundlings to run the school. She also continued to teach improv, as well as directing and overseeing the training of its acting teachers. In addition to her work at The Groundlings, she also co-founded the ACME Comedy Theatre in 1989, as well as taught at Keep It Real Acting.

Szigeti's improv students at The Groundlings and the ACME Comedy Theatre included Adam Carolla, Will Forte, Joel McHale, Conan O'Brien, Cheri Oteri and Julia Sweeney. Actress Lisa Kudrow, who studied under her at The Groundlings during the 1980s, called Szigeti "the best thing that happened, on so many levels" and credited her with changing her perspective on acting. In a 2012 interview with the Archive of American Television, Kudrow spoke of her experience studying under Szigeti, "She spoke to me in a way that no on else could have. I wasn't going to be OK with a touchy, feely, everyone sort of moan, crazy acting exercise thing. She was, 'There's no time in improv to work up to an emotion! You guys just need to have it [immediately]! It's all pretend anyway!'." It was Szigeti who encouraged Kudrow to create her first "dumb" or "airhead" character, which Kudrow had initially resisted.

Outside of improv, Szigeti accumulated her own numerous film and television credits, which spanned several decades. Her film credits included I Never Promised You a Rose Garden (1977), You Light Up My Life (1977), The Gong Show Movie (1980), Repo Man (1984), The Wrong Guys (1988) and Up Close and Personal (1996). Her television sitcom roles included WKRP in Cincinnati, Gimme a Break!, Married... with Children, Who's the Boss?, Empty Nest, The Norm Show, The King of Queens and Curb Your Enthusiasm.

Most notably, Szigeti played Jerry Seinfeld's former high school girlfriend in a 1991 episode of Seinfeld called "The Library". In the episode, Seinfeld tracks down Szigeti's character to use her as an alibi for a borrowed book which he never returned to the New York Public Library.

Death and legacy

Szigeti died from idiopathic pulmonary fibrosis at her home in Los Angeles on August 10, 2016, at the age of 66. Gunnar Todd Rohrbacher, an acting coach, founder of Actors Comedy Studio, and another of Szigeti's former students wrote a tribute to Szigeti, noting, "She was definitely intimidating, unapologetic, shockingly intelligent, generous, joyful and demanding... She would tell stories that included names like Bruce Springsteen, Robin Williams, Martin Short, Robert Redford and Helen Mirren. If you studied with her, your life was changed, and it was that simple."

Filmography
The Big Bus (1976) - Bus Passenger #21
American Raspberry (1977) - Dawn
I Never Promised You a Rose Garden (1977) - Nurse
You Light Up My Life (1977) - Cousin
The Gong Show Movie (1980) - Diner Doll Sophie
What's Up, Hideous Sun Demon (1983) - Nurse Darlene
Repo Man (1984) - Deidre, U.F.O. Lady
Johnny Dangerously (1984) - Mrs. Capone
National Lampoon's European Vacation (1985) - Mrs. Froeger
Hunk (1987) - Chachka
The Wrong Guys (1988) - Spa Matron
976-EVIL (1988) - Female Operator
A Sinful Life (1989) - Mrs. Crow
Midnight Ride (1990) - Mrs. Egan
Where the Day Takes You (1991) - Counselor
Man of the Year (1995) - Betty Levy
Beverly Hills 90210 (1995) - Madame Raven
Up Close and Personal (1996) - Focus Group Member #6
Nobody Knows Anything! (2003) - Jimmy's Mother
Diamonds and Guns (2008) - Mrs. Antignatti
Married With Children Season 07. Episode 16. - Bertha

References

External links

1949 births
2016 deaths
Acting teachers
American film actresses
American television actresses
UCLA Film School alumni
21st-century American women